Glimboca is a commune in Caraș-Severin County, western Romania, with a population of 1,930 people. It is composed of a single village, Glimboca.

References

Communes in Caraș-Severin County
Localities in Romanian Banat